Five Corners is an unincorporated community in Knox County, in the U.S. state of Ohio.

History
A former variant name of Five Corners was Milfordton. A post office called Milfordton was established in 1848, and remained in operation until 1902. Besides the post office, Five Corners had a schoolhouse and two churches.

References

Unincorporated communities in Knox County, Ohio
1848 establishments in Ohio
Populated places established in 1848
Unincorporated communities in Ohio